This is a list of notable Lustron houses.  A Lustron house is a home built using enameled metal.  There were about 2500 prefabricated homes built in this manner.

Numerous Lustron houses have been listed on the National Register of Historic Places.

Lustron houses

Notable surviving Lustron houses include:

Alabama
Lustron House on Columbiana Road, Birmingham, Alabama, listed on the National Register of Historic Places (NRHP) in Jefferson County (now demolished)
E. H. Darby Lustron House, Florence, Alabama, NRHP-listed in Lauderdale County
John D. and Katherine Gleissner Lustron House, Birmingham, Alabama, NRHP-listed in Jefferson County (now demolished)
Doit W. McClellan Lustron House, Jackson, Alabama, NRHP-listed in Clarke County
J. P. McKee Lustron House, Jackson, Alabama, NRHP-listed in Clarke County
E.L. Newman Lustron House, Sheffield, Alabama, NRHP-listed in Colbert County
William Bowen Lustron House, Florence, Alabama, NRHP-listed in Lauderdale County
Bernice L. Wright Lustron House, Birmingham, Alabama, NRHP-listed in Jefferson County (now demolished)
Margaret Quayle Lustron House, Tuscaloosa, Alabama, NRHP-listed in Tuscaloosa County

Arkansas
Lustron House, 1302 S. Tyler, Little Rock
Lustron House, 216 Richmond Drive, Helena-West Helena

Florida
Alfred and Olive Thorpe Lustron House, Fort Lauderdale, Florida, listed on the NRHP in Broward County
Lustron House - 1011 E Crenshaw Street, Tampa, Florida
Jack and Opalle Besser Lustron House (#1687), 1956 Rose Street, Sarasota, Florida
Lustron House - 2201 15th Ave W, Bradenton, Florida

Georgia

Thomas and Rae Epting Lustron House, Atlanta, Georgia, listed on the NRHP in Fulton County
William and Ruth Knight Lustron House, Atlanta, Georgia, listed on the NRHP in Fulton County
Jack and Helen Adams Lustron House, Atlanta, Georgia, listed on the NRHP in Fulton County
Lustron House at 1200 Fifth Avenue, Albany, Georgia, listed on the NRHP in Dougherty County
Lustron House at 3498 McKenzie Drive, Macon, Georgia, listed on the NRHP in Bibb County
Lustron House at 547 Oak Avenue, Americus, Georgia, listed on the NRHP in Sumter County
Lustron House at 711 Ninth Avenue, Albany, Georgia, listed on the NRHP in Dougherty County
Russell and Nelle Pines Lustron House, Decatur, Georgia, once listed on the NRHP in DeKalb County
Neville and Helen Farmer Lustron House, Decatur, Georgia, listed on the NRHP in DeKalb County

Illinois
Arlington Heights
Lustron House,  836 N Dunton Ave [Arlington Heights, Illinois] (Since torn down)
Bedford Park
Lustron House, 7710 W. 66th Street, Bedford Park, Illinois
Yorkville
Lustron House, South Main Street at West Dolph Street, Yorkville
Champaign-Urbana
Lustron House, Model 02, Serial number 01391, 1011 W Hill St., Champaign, Illinois
Lustron House, 1213 W Daniel St., Champaign, Illinois 
Lustron House, 1201 W Green St., Champaign, Illinois
Lustron House, 1109 W Clark St., Champaign, Illinois
Lustron House, 504 S Lincoln, Ave, Urbana, Illinois, original house with an addition of two bedrooms and another bathroom 
Lustron House, 110 S Glover St., Urbana, Illinois
Highland
Lustron House, Highland, IL on Poplar Street near 8th Street.
Lustron House, Highland on Laurel Street, South end of the street, East side of street.
Belvidere
Lustron House, 1039 Maple Avenue, Belvidere, Illinois
Lustron House, 420 E. Madison Street, Belvidere, Illinois
Lustron House, 415 N. State Street, Belvidere, Illinois 
Lustron House, 518 W. Boone Street, Belvidere, Illinois 
Lincolnshire
Lustron House, Stonegate Circle in Lincolnshire, Illinois is a largely intact neighborhood of Lustron homes.
Litchfield
Lustron House, 310 N. Montgomery, Litchfield, Illinois
Macomb
Lustron House, 537 S. Dudley St, Macomb, Illinois
Lustron House, 309 S. Edwards, Macomb, Illinois 
Mendota
Lustron House, 1007 Michigan Ave, Mendota, Illinois
Aurora
Lustron House, Rosedale Ave in Aurora, Illinois, at 119, 34, 32, 16 Rosedale Avenue.
Salem
Lustron House, 400 block of Indiana Ave, Salem, Illinois
Wilmette
Lustron House, 2545 Lake Avenue, Wilmette, Illinois
Skokie
Lustron House, 8557 Central Park Ave., Skokie, Illinois
Sycamore
Lustron House, 942 Dekalb Ave., Sycamore, IL 60178
Rockford
Lustron Home, 3516 Carolina Ave. Rockford, IL 
Lustron House, 2024 Kilburn Ave, Rockford, IL
Lustron House, 2021 Kilburn Ave, Rockford, IL
Lustron House, 1620 26th St, Rockford, IL
Lustron House, 2028 Idaho Pkwy, Rockford, IL (with garage) Maize Yellow
Lustron House, 1908 Ohio Pkwy, Rockford, IL (with garage)
Lustron House, 1625 Oregon Ave, Rockford, IL (with garage)
Lustron House, 1905 Oregon Ave., Rockford, IL (homes exterior has been redone in brick and interior has been altered)
Lustron House, 3208 West Gate Pkwy, Rockford, IL (with garage)
Lombard
Lustron House, 39 S. Westmore-Meyers Rd, Lombard, IL
Lustron House, 305 E. Morningside Ave, Lombard, IL
Lustron House, 454 S. Edgewood Ave, Lombard, IL 
Lustron House, 504 S. Edgewood Ave, Lombard, IL (updated with composite roof, vinyl siding, and new windows)
Lustron House, 1127 E Division St, Lombard, IL
Lustron House, 257 East Madison St, Lombard, IL
Lustron House, 321 East Madison St, Lombard, IL
Algonquin
Lustron House, 1603 N.River Rd, Algonquin, IL
Palatine
Lustron House, 129 S Hale St, Palatine, IL (the one next door has been torn down)
Lustron House,  221 S Bothwell St, Palatine, IL
Lustron House, 253 S Bothwell St, Palatine, IL
Lustron House,  325 S Hale St, Palatine, IL TORN DOWN
Jacksonville
Lustron House, SW Corner North Laurel Dr and Hardin Ave, Jacksonville, IL (with garage)
Geneva
Lustron House, 432 Austin Ave., Geneva, IL
West Chicago
Lustron House, 109 E. York Ave., West Chicago, IL
McHenry
Lustron House, 2423 Mogra Dr., McHenry, Il. 60050
Springfield
Lustron House, 2424 S. Pasfield, Springfield, IL
Lustron House, 2327 S. Pasfield, Springfield, IL
Lustron House, 2517 S. State St, Springfield, IL
German Valley
Lustron House, 44 Stephenson St, German Valley, IL
Peotone
Lustron House, 216 N. Second St, Peotone, IL.
Brookfield
Lustron House, 3201 Madison Ave., Brookfield IL
Princeton
Lustron House, 1029 S Fifth St., Princeton, IL 61356
Lustron House, S. Chestnut St., Princeton, IL 61356
Lustron House, E. Thompson St., Princeton, IL 61356

Indiana

 Lustron House, 3121 N National Rd, Columbus, IN
 Lustron House, 729 Lake Front Drive, Beverly Shores, La Porte County, IN
 Lustron House, Beverly Shores, Porter County, IN (previously at 103 Lake Front Drive, Beverly Shores).
 Lustron House, 104 State Park Road, Beverly Shores, Porter County, IN
 Lustron House, 115 DeWolfe St, Michigan City, La Porte County, IN
Lustron House, 222 N Carroll Ave, Michigan City, La Porte County, IN
 Lustron House, Stephens Street, Chesterton, Porter County, IN (previously at 204 Lake Front Drive, Beverly Shores, Porter County, IN)
Norris and Harriet Coambs Lustron House, Chesterton, Indiana, listed on the NRHP in Porter, Indiana
Roy and Iris Corbin Lustron House, Indianapolis, Indiana, listed on the NRHP in Marion County
 Lustron House, 707 Ohio Ave.,  Auburn, IN, DeKalb County
 Lustron House, 909 N. Van Buren St., Auburn, IN, DeKalb County
 Lustron House, 208 Oak St., Wilkinson, IN, Hancock County
 Lustron House, 18689 Lane St. Crown Point, IN.
 Lustron House, 1319 US-30 Schererville, IN
 Lustron House, 7423 Woodmar Ave. Hammond.
 Lustron House, 2047 169th St. Hammond.
 Lustron House, 114 N. Indiana St. Remington.
 Lustron House, 504 Willow St. Rising Sun.
 Lustron House, 168 SW 13th St. Richmond.
 Lustron House, 3228 Avon Lane Richmond.
 Lustron House, 3240 Berwyn Lane Richmond.
 Lustron House, 4601 South Washington St., Marion, Grant County, IN
 Lustron House, 318 East 7th St., Marion, Grant County, IN
 Lustron House (with wood framed addition), 1320 North Wabash Ave., Marion, Grant County, IN
 Lustron House, 909 West Sixth St., Marion, Grant County, IN
 Lustron House, 3501 South Galletin St., Marion, Grant County, IN
 Lustron House, 316 West Fleming Ave., Fort Wayne, Allen County, IN
 Lustron House, 1447 Michigan Rd, Madison
 Lustron House, 5638 Indianaola Ave, Indianapolis
 Lustron House, 216 S 10th Ave, Beech Grove
 Lustron House, 1029 N. Hawthorne Lane, Indianapolis Winchester Deluxe 02, two car garage.
 Lustron House, 2121 Pennsylvania Street, Columbus, Bartholomew County
 Lustron House, Leland Ave, Indianapolis, IN 46218
 Lustron House, 11th St, Indianapolis, IN
 Lustron House, 1920 Kessler Blvd, South Bend, IN 46616
 Lustron House, 6466 Central Ave, Indianapolis, IN
 Lustron House, 6435 River View, Indianapolis, IN
 Lustron House, 1627 S Mulberry St, Muncie, IN 47302
Lustron House, 49 Maple St, Danville, IN 46122

Iowa
 Lustron House  - 2048 Avalon Rd, Dubuque, Iowa
 Lustron House  -  501 Court St, Bellevue, Iowa
 Lustron House  -  210 School St, Carlisle, Iowa
 Lustron Home No. 02102 - 2009 Williams Blvd. SW, Cedar Rapids, Iowa  NRHP-listed in Linn County.
 Lustron House  - 708 11th Ave, Coralville, Iowa
 Lustron House  -  3706 53rd St, Des Moines, Iowa
 Lustron House  - 4343 Chamberlain, Des Moines, Iowa
 Lustron House  -  1460 South Grandview Ave, Dubuque, Iowa
 Lustron House  -  514 Cooper Pl, Dubuque, Iowa
 Lustron House - 209 NE Jacob St, Grimes, Iowa
 Lustron House  -  508 Federal St. South, Hampton, Iowa
 Lustron House  -  609 West Salem St, Indianola, Iowa
 Lustron House  -  13796 Highway 65/69,  Indianola, Iowa
 Glenn and Nell Kurtz Lustron Home and Garage  -  2017 Washington Ave, Iowa Falls, Iowa, NRHP-listed in Hardin County.
 Lustron House  -  627 D St, Iowa City, Iowa
 Lustron House  -  705 Clark St, Iowa City, Iowa
 Lustron House  -  805 Melrose Ave,  Iowa City, Iowa
 Lustron House  -  903 Elm Ave, Norwalk, Iowa
 Lustron House  -  1356 Main St, Pella, Iowa
 Lustron House  -  400 East St, Tipton, Iowa
 Lustron House  -  2020 W. 3rd St., Waterloo, Iowa
 Lustron House  -  222 Kenilworth Rd, Waterloo, Iowa
 Lustron House  -  249 Kenilworth Rd, Waterloo, Iowa
 Lustron House  -  225 Cornwall Ave, Waterloo, Iowa
 Lustron House No. 02437  -  1440 63rd Street, Windsor Heights, Iowa  NRHP-listed in Polk County
 Lustron House - 2826 38th St, Des Moines, Iowa
 Lustron House - 5827 Kingman Ave, Des Moines, Iowa
 Lustron House - 1623 Pine St, Burlington, Iowa
 Lustron House - 1737 Pine St, Burlington, Iowa
 Lustron House - 1809 Mason Rd, Burlington, Iowa
 Lustron House - 2223 S Main St, Burlington, Iowa
 Lustron House - 2608 Sunnyside Ave, Burlington, Iowa

Kansas
Berger House - 208 NE 12th St., Abilene, Kansas, listed on the NRHP in Dickinson County, KS
Stein House - 420 Cedar St., Ashland, Kansas, listed on the NRHP in Clark County, KS
Lustron House - 804 4th Ave., Dodge City, Kansas
Lustron House - 405 N. 4th St., Garden City, Kansas
Lustron House - 407 East Laurel, Garden City, Kansas
Abel House - 2601 Paseo Dr., Great Bend, Kansas, listed on the NRHP in Barton County, KS
Nagel House - 1411 Wilson St., Great Bend, Kansas, listed on the NRHP in Barton County, KS
Lustron House - 1307 Coolidge St., Great Bend, Kansas
Lustron House - 1310 Coolidge St., Great Bend, Kansas
Lustron House - 1301 Harding St., Great Bend, Kansas
Lustron House - 3410 Broadway, Great Bend, Kansas
Lustron House - Barton County Historical Society, Great Bend, Kansas
Drees House - 100 E 19th St., Hays, Kansas, listed on the NRHP in Ellis County, KS
Lustron House - 103 W 20th St., Hays, Kansas
Lustron House - 308 E 20th St., Hays, Kansas
Gallagher House - 310 E 20th St., Hays, Kansaslisted on the NRHP in Ellis County, KS
Lustron House - 400 E 20th St., Hays, Kansas
McFadden House - 315 W 5th St., Holton, Kansas, listed on the NRHP in Jackson County, KS 
Lustron House - 21 E 27th Ave., Hutchinson, Kansas
Lustron House - 1124 Toles Ave., Larned, Kansas
Lustron House - 612 Mann Ave., Larned, Kansas
Lustron House - 505 W 5th St., Larned, Kansas
Ooten House - 507 W 15th St., Larned, Kansas, listed on the NRHP in Pawnee County, KS
Lustron House - 721 Martin Ave., Larned, Kansas
Patterson House - 841 W 8th St., Larned, Kansas, listed on the NRHP in Pawnee County, KS
Lustron House - 823 Starks Dr., Larned, Kansas
Lustron House - 1421 State St., Larned, Kansas
Lustron House - 740 Thornton St., Leavenworth, Kansas
Coleman House - 408 Mead St., Newton, Kansas, listed on the NRHP in Harvey County, KS
Mann House 614 Oakdale, Russell, Kansas, listed on the NRHP in Russell County, KS
Woelk House 615 Sunset, Russell, Kansas, listed on the NRHP in Russell County, KS
Grimes House - 214 Park St., Smith Center, Kansas, listed on the NRHP in Smith County, KS
Lustron House - 3505 SW 10th St., Topeka, Kansas
Stradal House - 409 N. 13th St., Wakeeney, Kansas, listed on the NRHP in Trego County, KS
Weinhold House - 2315 Ave C, Wilson, Kansas, listed on the NRHP in Ellsworth County, KS
Lustron House - 4621 Lloyd St., Kansas City, Kansas

Kentucky
Kentucky boasts some 36 remaining examples of Lustron houses.   These homes were said to “provide new and richer experiences for the whole family, where  mother has far more hours, youngsters have far fewer worries, and far more leisure for dad.

http://www.lustronpreservation.org/lustron-library

 Lustron House - 956 Collins Ln, Frankfort, Kentucky. A Westchester Deluxe model in Dove Grey color. 
 Lustron House - 2423 West Cumberland Avenue, Middlesboro, Kentucky Google Map - Near Corner of South 24th Street
 Lustron House - 2428 West Cumberland Avenue, Middlesboro, Kentucky Google Map - Corner of North 25th Street
 Lustron House - 1920 Winston Avenue, Louisville, Kentucky
 Lustron House - 1922 Winston Avenue, Louisville, Kentucky 
 Lustron House - 1911 Gladstone Avenue, Louisville, Kentucky
 Lustron House - 2827 Eleanor Avenue, Louisville, Kentucky

Louisiana

Lustron House  -  110 Hudson, Pineville, Louisiana
Lustron House - Huber Park section of Lake Charles, Louisiana

New Orleans
Over a dozen Lustron houses known to have been constructed in New Orleans, about half still existed as of February 2019, some in substantially altered condition. All documented Lustron houses erected in New Orleans were Winchester models.  A possibly unique "double bungalow" constructed of two Lustron houses joined together is located at 9412-14 Stroelitz Street.

Lustron House  -  128 Central Park Place, New Orleans, Louisiana
Lustron House  -   3700 Cherry Street, New Orleans, Louisiana
Lustron House  -   3704 Cherry Street, New Orleans, Louisiana
Lustron House  -  3629 Livingston Street, New Orleans, Louisiana - stuccoed over in late 2000's
Lustron House  -  3635 Livingston Street, New Orleans, Louisiana
Lustron House -  9412-14 Stroelitz Street, New Orleans, Louisiana - Double constructed of two joined Lustron Houses
Julius Reese Residence  -  4940 St. Roch Avenue, New Orleans, Louisiana 
Lustron House  -  41 Wren Street, New Orleans, Louisiana - demolished late 2019

Massachusetts
Lustron House - 692 Salem St, Groveland, Massachusetts
Lustron House - 22 Payson Rd, Brookline, Massachusetts
Lustron House - 59 Chellman St, West Roxbury, Massachusetts (heavily damaged by fire on September 29, 2018, currently abandoned and will possibly be demolished in the future)
Lustron House - 4 North St. Greenfield, Massachusetts
lustron house - 316 S Mountain Rd Pittsfield, Massachusetts

Michigan
Lustron House - 654 Ashland Street, Detroit, MI 48215
Lustron House - 903 E Michigan Ave, Paw Paw, MI 49079
Lustron House - 304 Center Street, Dowagiac, MI 49047
Lustron House - 305 Courtland Street, Dowagiac, MI 49047
Lustron House - 2262 Lake Dr SE, East Grand Rapids, MI 49506
Lustron House - 1849 Philadelphia Ave SE, Grand Rapids, MI 49507 
Lustron House - 255 Bedford Rd. N., Battle Creek, Michigan
Lustron House - 147 Chesnut Street, Battle Creek, Michigan
Lustron House - 3060 Lakewood Drive, Ann Arbor, Michigan
Lustron House - 605 Linda Vista, Ann Arbor, Michigan
Lustron Houses - 1121, 1125, 1129 Bydding, Ann Arbor, Michigan
Lustron House - 1711 Chandler, Ann Arbor, Michigan
Lustron House - 800 Starwick, Ann Arbor, Michigan
Lustron House - 1910 Longshore, Ann Arbor, Michigan
Lustron House - 1200 S Seventh, Ann Arbor, Michigan
Lustron House - 2524 Martin Ave. SE, Grand Rapids, Michigan
Lustron House - 1009 Clover, Kalamazoo, Michigan (Newport Model 023) 
Lustron House - 1421 Olmstead Road, Kalamazoo, Michigan
Lustron House - 2022 Lakeway, Kalamazoo, Michigan
Lustron House - 23420 Oneida St. Oak Park, Michigan
Lustron House - 23440 Oneida St. Oak Park, Michigan

Minnesota
Lustron House - 1007 6th Ave SW, Austin, Minnesota 55912
Lustron House - 4900 Cedar Ave, Minneapolis, Minnesota 55417
Lustron House - 4916 Cedar Ave, Minneapolis, Minnesota 55417
Lustron House - 2436 Mt View Ave, Minneapolis, Minnesota 55405
Lustron House - 5009 Nicollet Ave, Minneapolis, Minnesota 55419
Lustron House - 5014 Nicollet Ave, Minneapolis, Minnesota 55419
Lustron House - 5021 Nicollet Ave, Minneapolis, Minnesota 55419
Lustron House - 5027 Nicollet Ave, Minneapolis, Minnesota 55419
Lustron House - 5047 Nicollet Ave, Minneapolis, Minnesota 55419
Lustron House - 5055 Nicollet Ave, Minneapolis, Minnesota 55419
Lustron House - 5217 S 31st Ave, Minneapolis, Minnesota 55417
Lustron House - 118 Iowa St, Minnesota City, Minnesota 55959
Lustron House - 3959 Yates Ave N, Robbinsdale, Minnesota 55422
Lustron House - 733 13th Ave NE, Rochester, Minnesota 55906
Lustron House - 2820 Roosevelt St NE, St Anthony, Minnesota 55418
Lustron House - 1270 10th Ave N, St Cloud, Minnesota 56303
Lustron House - 312 2nd St SW, Wadena, Minnesota 56482
Lustron House - 718 Mankato Ave, Winona, Minnesota 55987

Missouri
There are a number of Lustron houses located in Brentwood.  Many of them are original and many of them have been sided, have additions, or have had the windows replaced with vinyl. There are also 3 in St. Charles, Missouri that are all owned by the same owner, and one next to I-70 in Wentzville. There is also one in Velda Village Missouri and two in St. Louis City on McDonald in the Tower Grove South neighborhood, No. 00804.

There are also 5 Lustron homes in the Kansas City area near 85th and Wornall Road. One of them was the display model and residence of the local sales representative. Local legend says that the salesman came home one day and told his wife that he no longer had a job because the company was bankrupt, but they still had their house.

In Kansas City there are at least 10 or more. This includes the Kansas City suburbs. In south Kansas City there are at least 6 in a mile radius. Three together on one street. Two are found north of Kansas City in Cameron.

 Lustron House  -  407 W Spring St, Boonville, Missouri
 Lustron House  -  409 West 3rd St., Cameron, Missouri
 Lustron House  -  528 South Walnut St., Cameron, Missouri
 Lustron House  -  930 Lindsay Lane, Florissant, Missouri
 Lustron House  -  W 16th St. & HWY 100 Hermann, Missouri
 Lustron House  -  1270 South Salt Pond Avenue; Marshall, Missouri
 Lustron House  -  1271 South Salt Pond Avenue; Marshall, Missouri
 Lustron House  -  1060 South Redman Avenue; Marshall, Missouri
 Lustron House  -  State Highway E, St. Francois Township, Missouri 37°29'36.5"N 90°26'28.1"W
 Lustron House  -  101 Eldridge Ave., Webster Groves, Missouri
 Lustron House  -  121 Eldridge Ave., Webster Groves, Missouri
 Lustron House  -  124 Eldridge Ave., Webster Groves, Missouri
 Lustron House  -  125 Eldridge Ave., Webster Groves, Missouri
 Lustron House  -  324 Hazel Ave., Webster Groves, Missouri
 Lustron House  -  330 Hazel Ave., Webster Groves, Missouri
 Lustron House  -  505 Ridge Ave., Webster Groves, Missouri
 Lustron House  -  441 S. Maple Ave., Webster Groves, Missouri
 Lustron House  -  1950 W Pearce Blvd, Wentzville, MO 63385
 Lustron House  -  8436 JARBOE ST, KANSAS CITY, Missouri
 Lustron House  -  1317 4th St., Platte City, Missouri
Lustron house - 227 E. Franklin st, Pacific Missouri

Nebraska
 Lustron House  -  1054 East 12th Street; Fremont, Nebraska 
 Lustron House  -  912 North Baltimore, Hastings, NE
 Lustron House  -  1802 North Park Ave, Fremont, Nebraska
 Lustron House  -  Washington St & Allegheny Ave, Venango, Nebraska
 Lustron House (Not verified) West 7th and St. James Ave. Wynot Nebraska
 Lustron House  -  2025 NW Radial Hwy; Omaha, NE
 Lustron House  -  1305 Norris Ave; McCook, NE

New Jersey
Harold Hess Lustron House, Closter Borough, New Jersey, listed on the NRHP in Bergen County
William A. Wittmer Lustron House, Alpine Borough, New Jersey, listed on the NRHP in Bergen County
 1300 Ocean Avenue, Seabright New Jersey- at northeast corner of Angler's Marina property. No other info known. Monmouth County
 4 Laurie Road, Landing, NJ 07850
 35 Vail Rd, Landing, NJ 07850

New York
Lustron Houses of Jermain Street Historic District, Albany, New York, listed on the NRHP in Albany County
Bishop Family Lustron House, Schenectady, New York, listed on the NRHP in Schenectady County
Lustron House, 23 Hurst Ave, Chautauqua NY 14722 (a contributing structure to the historic district of Chautauqua Institution )
Lustron House, 4 Droms Rd Ext, Glenville, NY 12302
Lustron House, 35 Phillips Road, Rensselaer, NY, 12144 (tan)
 Lustron House , 6 Lake Shore Dr, Rensselaer, NY 12144 (blue)
Bullins Family Lustron House,(Westchester Deluxe 3 bedroom), 9 Sanborn Ave, Plattsburgh, NY 12901 (home of Jeffrey Bullins, author)
Lustron House (Westchester Deluxe 3 bedroom), 601 Clay St, Vestal NY 13850
Lustron House (Westchester Standard 2 bedroom), 2448 Vestal Parkway E, Vestal NY 13850
Lustron House (Newport 2 bedroom), 2452 Vestal Parkway E, Vestal NY 13850
Lustron House 201 Brookland Drive, Syracuse, NY 13208
Lustron House of Roxford Road South, Syracuse, New York 
Lustron House (Westchester Standard 2 bedroom), [[Www.270osborneroad.com|270 Osborne Road, Loudonville, NY 12211]
 Lustron House 266 Osborne Rd., Loudonville, NY 12211
 Lustron House 268 Osborne Rd, Loudonville, NY 12211 Heavily modified.
 Lustron House, 1 Charming Lane, Loudonville, NY 12211
 Lustron House, 2 Charming Lane, Loudonville, NY 12211
 Lustron House, 249 Hackett Blvd, Albany, NY (re-sided, addition)
 Lustron House, 355 South Main Ave, Albany, NY (tan, Lustron Garage)
Lustron house (Westchester Deluxe) 26 Palmer Avenue in Ballston Lake, NY (tan)
 Lustron House, 55 Church St (Route 50), Ballston Spa, NY (tan, altered windows)
Lustron house (Westchester Deluxe), 10 Pond Meadow Road, Croton on Hudson, NY 10520
Lustron House, 121 Manor Dr, Syracuse, New York
Visual I.D.
Lustron House, 37 Park St, Port Crane, NY 13833 , light gray pictures on Zillow 
Lustron House, Westchester 2 model on basement, 20 Henrietta Blvd, Amsterdam, NY (tan)
Lustron House, Westchester 2 model, 110 Evelyn Ave, Amsterdam, NY (Light Blue)
Lustron House, Westchester 3 model + G-2 Garage and Breezeway, 23 Dartmouth, Amsterdam, NY (Destroyed by fire) (Light Gray)
Lustron House, Westchester 2 model, 207 Northampton Road, Amsterdam, NY (tan)
 Lustron House, Blue, 15 Blue Barns Rd., Rexford, NY
Lustron House, 2 bedroom,  Yellow.  121 Manor Dr, Syracuse, NY

North Carolina 

 Lustron Houses of North Carolina, NC Modernist Society (numerous NC examples shown on this page)
 Thirsty Skull Brewing - Pittsboro Taproom, Lustron House, Westchester 2 model, 684 West Street, Pittsboro, NC (tan)
Lustron House, Westchester Deluxe 2 model, 1404 Virginia Avenue, Durham, NC 27705  
Lustron House, Westchester Deluxe 2 model, 2302 Lawndale Dr, Greensboro NC
Lustron House, Westchester Deluxe 2 model, 1321 Sunset Ave, Rocky Mount, NC (tan), with Lustron shed
Lustron House, 1821 Ebert Road, Winston-Salem NC

North Dakota 
 Lustron House, 1122 Third Street, Devils Lake
 Lustron House, 1021 Fifth Street Northeast, Devils Lake
 Lustron House, 1036 Fifth Street Northeast, Devils Lake
 Lustron House and Garage, 1501 South Fifth Street, Fargo
 Lustron House, 1545 South Sixth Street, Fargo
 Lustron House, 1613 South Sixth Street, Fargo
 Lustron House, 1621 South Sixth Street, Fargo
 Lustron House, 1622 South Sixth Street, Fargo
 Lustron House, 1434 North Ninth Street, Fargo
 Lustron House, 208 3rd Street West, Finley
 Lustron House, 209 10th Street West, Harvey
 Lustron House, 208 First Avenue Southeast, Hillsboro
 Lustron House, 424 12th Avenue, Langdon
 Lustron House, relocated to the Grand Forks County Historical Society, 2405 Belmont Road, Grand Forks

Ohio 

Northwest
 Lustron House 805 E Tully St, Convoy, Ohio (3 bedroom)
 Lustron House 2906 Hudson Dr, Cuyahoga Falls, Ohio
 Lustron House 130 Woodley Ave, Findlay, Ohio (number 665)
 Lustron House 713 Maple Heights Dr, Galion, Ohio
 Lustron House 717 Maple Heights Dr, Galion, Ohio
 Lustron House 729 Maple Heights Dr, Galion, Ohio
 Lustron House 736 Maple Heights Dr, Galion, Ohio
 Lustron House 2942 Starr Ave, Oregon, Ohio 
 Lustron House 3547 Starr Ave, Oregon, Ohio 
 Lustron House 519 W Indiana Ave, Perrysburg, Ohio 
 Lustron House 1649 Circular Rd, Toledo, Ohio
 Lustron House 4219 Douglas Rd, Toledo, Ohio
 Lustron House 3851 Watson Ave, Toledo, Ohio
 Lustron House 2003 Farnham Rd, Toledo, Ohio
 Lustron House 2123 Copley Dr, Toledo, Ohio
 Lustron House 1862 Wildwood Rd, Toledo, Ohio
 Lustron House 4337 Harvest Ln, Toledo, Ohio
 Lustron House 4938 Fair Oaks Dr, Toledo, Ohio
 Lustron House 44 W Poinsetta Ave, Toledo, Ohio
 Lustron House 5401 Ottawa River Rd, Toledo, Ohio
 Lustron House 1848 E Manhattan Blvd, Toledo, Ohio
 Lustron House 2651 Greenway St, Toledo, Ohio
 Lustron House 540 W Gramercy Ave, Toledo, Ohio
 Lustron House 3244 Heatherdowns Blvd, Toledo, Ohio
 Lustron House 1649 Riverview Ct, Toledo, Ohio
 Lustron House 3209 Beverly Dr, Toledo, Ohio
 Lustron House 2348 Sherwood Ave, Toledo, Ohio
 Lustron House 2712 Copland Blvd, Toledo, Ohio
 Lustron House 2975 S Byrne Rd, Toledo, Ohio
 Lustron House 742 Waybridge Rd, Toledo, Ohio
 Lustron House 4601 Willys Pkwy, Toledo, Ohio
 Lustron House 2757 York St, Toledo, Ohio

Northeast
 Lustron House 1001 Overlook Drive, Alliance, Ohio
 Lustron House 4908 13th Street SW, Canton, Ohio (2 bedroom, Tan)
 Lustron House 1500 Merl Ave, Cleveland, Ohio 44109 (serial #01093; 2 bedrooms, 1 bath, 1059 sq.ft)
 Lustron House 1022 Keystone Rd, Cleveland Heights, Ohio
 Lustron House 2906 Hudson Drive, Cuyahoga Falls, Ohio
 Lustron House 110 Hummel Ave, New Philadelphia, Ohio
 Lustron House 24070 Mastick Rd, North Olmsted, Ohio
Lustron House, 222 Opal Blvd, Steubenville, Ohio (2 bedroom, 1 bath. Garage. 964 sq.ft)
 Lustron House 24048 Mastick Rd, North Olmsted, Ohio
 Lustron House, 2812 Rogers Rd, Youngstown, Ohio

Central
 Lustron House, 272 East Weisheimer, Columbus, Ohio
 Lustron House, 27 Kanawha, Columbus, Ohio
 Lustron House, 185 Arden, Columbus, Ohio
 Lustron House, 214 Arden, Columbus, Ohio
 Lustron House 868 S. Broadleigh Rd, Columbus, Ohio
 Lustron House 1616 E Weber Road, Columbus Ohio
 Lustron House 34 S. Broadleigh Rd, Columbus, Ohio
 Lustron House 618 Brookside Dr, Columbus, Ohio
 Lustron House 101 Edgevale Rd, Columbus, Ohio
 Lustron House 71 N. Kellner Rd, Columbus, Ohio
 Lustron Garage 45 N. Ashburton Rd, Columbus, Ohio
 Lustron House 2452 Lockbourne Rd, Columbus, Ohio (Newport model)
 Lustron House 160 S. James Rd, Columbus, Ohio (Newport, basement garage, moved from Lustron factory)
 Lustron House 79 S. Hamilton Rd, Gahanna, Ohio (3-bedroom)
 Lustron House 188 Welsh Hills Rd, Granville, Ohio (basement)
 Lustron House 1959 Harrisburg Pk, Grove City, Ohio
 Lustron House 3359 Kingston Ave, Grove City, Ohio
 Lustron House 6 W Lamartine St, Mount Vernon, Ohio
 Lustron House 247 Stare Road Newark, Ohio
 Lustron House North 30th St Newark, Ohio
 Lustron House 7491 S. Black Rd, Pataskala, Ohio
 Lustron House 7658 E. Main St, Reynoldsburg, Ohio (3-bdrm, garage, breezeway)
 Lustron House 9990 Lilly Chapel Georgesville Rd, West Jefferson, Ohio
 Lustron House 400 N. Hamilton Rd, Whitehall, Ohio

Southwest
 Lustron House 4705 Sycamore Road, Cincinnati, Ohio
 Lustron House 2900 Princeton Dr, Dayton, Ohio
 Lustron House 2905 Princeton Dr, Dayton, Ohio
 Lustron House 2820 Earlham Dr, Dayton, Ohio
 Lustron House 2810 Earlham Dr, Dayton, Ohio
 Lustron House 3007 Cornell Dr, Dayton, Ohio
 Lustron House 1647 Parkhill Dr, Dayton, Ohio
 Lustron House 1734 Tennyson Ave, Dayton, Ohio
 Lustron House 160 W Norman Ave, Dayton, Ohio
 Lustron House 92 Carson Ave, Dayton, Ohio
 Lustron House 8200 Inwood Ave, Dayton, Ohio
 Lustron House, 66 Fer Don Road, Dayton, Ohio
 Lustron House 103 Memorial Dr, Greenville, OH 
 Lustron House 1107 Sorg Place, Middletown, Ohio
 Lustron House 2700 Flemming Rd, Middletown, Ohio
 Lustron House 506 Aberdeen Dr, Middletown, Ohio
 Lustron House 925 Fourteenth Ave, Middletown, Ohio
 Lustron House 3933 Standish Ave, Silverton, Ohio
 Lustron House 214 East McCreight Ave, Springfield, Ohio
Lustron House 1987 Harshman Blvd, Springfield, Ohio
 Lustron House 53 West Mills Ave, Wyoming, Ohio

Southeast
 Lustron House 2612 Shawnee Rd, Portsmouth, Ohio

Oklahoma
House at 1554 SW Rogers, Bartlesville, OK
Josephine Reifsnyder Lustron House, Stillwater, OK
Christian K. Usher Luston House, Cushing, OK

North Dakota
Lustron House, On the grounds of the Grands Forks County Historical Society, 2405 Belmont Road, Grand Forks, ND

Pennsylvania 

 Lustron House, 6603 Forward Avenue, Pittsburgh, PA
 Lustron House, 6605 Forward Avenue, Pittsburgh, PA
 Lustron House, 14 Woodlawn Avenue, Crafton, PA
 Lustron House, 916 Kahkwa Blvd., Erie, PA
 Lustron House, 156 Parkway Dr., Erie, PA
 Lustron House, 3907 Iroquois Ave., Erie, PA
 Lustron House, 406 E. Fairfield Avenue, New Castle, PA
 Lustron House, 1814 E Caracas Ave, Hershey, PA
 Lustron House, 2179 Connolly Ave, Bethlehem, PA
 Lustron House, 138 Norman Way, Erie, PA
 Lustron House, 3225 Edinburgh RD, Allentown, PA
 Lustron House, 1217 N 17th St, Harrisburg, PA
 Lustron House, 1603 Robin Rd, Lebanon, PA 17042
 Lustron House. 5621 Devonshire Rd Harrisburg, PA
 Lustron House, 421 Fifth Street, California, PA
 Lustron House, 815 Shutterly Street, California, PA
 Lustron House, 810 Hawthorne Rd, Bethlehem, PA
 Lustron House, 2113 Hackett Avenue, Easton, PA

South Dakota
 Cassidy House, Lustron Newport 2-Bedroom, 4121 Canyon Lake Drive, Rapid City, South Dakota, listed on the NRHP in Pennington County
Maurice Nelson House, Rapid City, South Dakota, listed on the NRHP in Pennington County
Faye Bowden-Agnus Saunders House, Huron, South Dakota, listed on the NRHP in Beadle County
Margaret and Vernon Moxon House, Huron, South Dakota, listed on the NRHP in Beadle County
Mack Jones House, Miller, listed on the NRHP in Hand County
Mitchell Lustron Historic District, a grouping of three Lustron homes in Mitchell, South Dakota, listed on the NRHP in Davison County
Peter Hansen House, Pierre, South Dakota, listed on the NRHP in Hughes County
Edbert and Josie Opitz House, Redfield, listed on the NRHP in Spink County
Orlan A Hayward House, Sioux Falls, listed on the NRHP in Minnehaha County
Grant J. Reynolds House, Sioux Falls, listed on the NRHP in Minnehaha County
Laura M. Welch House, Sioux Falls, listed on the NRHP in Minnehaha County

Tennessee
Caldwell Lustron House, Union City, Tennessee, listed on the NRHP in Obion County
2399 Eastwood Avenue, Binghampton, Memphis, Tennessee
3608 Charleswood Avenue, High Point Terrace, Memphis, Tennessee, listed on the NRHP in Shelby County

Texas
 Lustron House, 5006 W Amherst Ave, Dallas, TX
 Lustron House, 4701 Marks Pl, Fort Worth TX

Virginia

 Lustron House, pre-fabricated, all steel, porcelain-enamel, 2 bedrooms on concrete slab, built in 1948, 4647 3rd Street South, Arlington, Arlington County Virginia, demolished 2007.
5201 12th Street, South, Arlington, Virginia, surveyed by the Historic American Buildings Survey (HABS), demolished October 24, 2016. 
130 Sunset Drive, Danville, Virginia.
144 Sunset Drive, Danville, Virginia.
193 Sunset Drive, Danville, Virginia.
218 Sunset Drive, Danville, Virginia.
179 Howeland Circle, Danville, Virginia.
176 Westminster Court, Danville, Virginia.
126 Clarendon Circle, Danville, Virginia.
127 Clarendon Circle. Danville, Virginia.
305 Cherry Lane, Danville, Virginia.

West Virginia 

106 Gillespie Addition, Beckley, WV
2213 Hess Ave, Wheeling, West Virginia
54 Elm Lane, Wheeling, West Virginia
2849 Washington Blvd Huntington Wv
400 Green Oak Dr, Huntington, WV
120 N. 8th Street, Wheeling WV
301 21st street Dunbar, WV 25064

There are at least four of these homes in the Kanawha City section of Charleston, WV, and four located in the Morgantown, WV area.

8 Pallister Rd., Wheeling WV

520 Johnson Ave., Bridgeport, WV

731 E Main St., Clarksburg, WV

Wisconsin 

Wisconsin received about 100 or so Lustron homes, built between 1948 and 1950.

Lake Geneva
1005 Grant Street, Lake Geneva, Wisconsin
 
Appleton

 99 Johnson Ct Appleton (two homes on cul du sac) 
 1909 N Union St Appleton

Beloit

1718 Arlington Ave, Beloit, WI

Black River Falls

 420 Pierce St, Black River Falls, WI 54615

Eau Claire

 Einar and Alice Borton House, listed on the National Register of Historic Places in Eau Claire County, Wisconsin
 1831 Badger Ave
 1700 Fairway St
 900 block, N. Hillcrest Pkwy

Fond du Lac

 341 Boyd st Fond du Lac, WI 54935

Green Bay

 998 9th Street, Green Bay, WI 54304
322 Bellevue Street, Green Bay, WI 54302
717 Porlier Street, Green Bay, WI 54301
 919 Reed Street, Green Bay, WI 54303 (razed)

Hillsboro

 635 Hillsborough Ave, Hillsboro, WI

Kenosha

 7502 21st Ave, Kenosha, Wisconsin 53143
 3901 Taft Road, Kenosha, WI 53142

 5540 37th Ave, Kenosha, Wisconsin 53144

La Crosse

 751 22nd St N, La Crosse, WI 54601
 4514 Mormon Coulee Rd, La Crosse, WI 54601
 1830 Losey Blvd S, La Crosse, WI 54601

Madison

 432 N Blackhawk Avenue, Madison, WI
 556 Chatham Ter, Madison, WI Demolished
 418 Critchell Ter, Madison, WI Demolished
 2410 Waunona Way, Madison, WI
 3553 Heather Crest Madison WI 
 3810 Saint Clair St, Madison, WI 
 513 N Owen Dr, Madison, WI 
 505 S Owen Dr, Madison, WI
 534 Glenway St, Madison, WI

Marshall

 200 Block of Elm Street Marshall, WI

Menasha
 712 Carver Lane, Menasha, WI

Middleton 
7120 North Avenue.  Yellow.

Milwaukee
In Milwaukee, 15 Lustron homes survive, as of 2014, in a cluster around Lincoln Creek north of Capitol Drive and Cooper Park.  These are mostly the Winchester model, but the home at 5520 W. Philip Pl., which has a "unique blue and yellow color scheme, is almost certainly one of the early Esquire “demonstration” homes, which first appeared in 1946."

 3802 West Capitol Drive, Milwaukee, Wisconsin

Monona

 1305 Wyldhaven Ave, Monona, WI
 208 Starry Ave, Monona, WI

Mount Horeb

 207 Center Ave, Mount Horeb, WI

New Glarus

  419 8th Avenue, New Glarus, Wisconsin

Oshkosh

  919 W 4th Avenue, Oshkosh, Wisconsin
  1020 Baldwin Avenue, Oshkosh, Wisconsin

Shullsburg

  221 S Galena St, Shullsburg, WI

Verona

 205 S Franklin Street, Verona, Wisconsin
203 Westlawn Ave, Verona, Wisconsin

Waterford

 105 North Jefferson Street, Waterford, Wisconsin

340 Origen Street, Burlington, WI

See also

List of Hobart Welded Steel House Co. houses

References

 
Lists of National Register of Historic Places
Prefabricated houses